Roberto Colacone (born 26 April 1974) is an Italian former footballer who played as a forward.

He spent most of his career in Serie B and Serie C1, and only played once in Serie A.

Career
Colacone started his career at Parma. He made his Serie A debut on 9 April 1994, against A.S. Roma. He then played for two Serie C1 clubs and Serie B club Foggia, and joined Lucchese of Serie B in summer 1997. Lucchese relegated to Serie C1 in summer 1999, but gave a chance for Colacone. He scored 14 goals in Serie C1 that season. In summer 2000, he was signed by Treviso of Serie B, but in October left for league rival Ravenna, and in January 2003 for Como (Serie C1).

Colacone followed Como promoted to Serie B in summer 2001, but when Como won promotion to Serie A in summer 2002, he was loaned to Vicenza of Serie B for next season. He then played for Genoa in Serie B, and left for league rival Ascoli for just 6 months. On 30 June 2005, he signed for Modena of Serie B on free transfer, but Ascoli later offered a place in Serie A.

In January 2008, he joined AlbinoLeffe of Serie B.

Italian football scandal
On 18 June 2012 Colacone was suspended for 4 years due to 2011–12 Italian football scandal.

References

External links
 gazzetta.it

Italian footballers
Parma Calcio 1913 players
Carrarese Calcio players
S.P.A.L. players
Calcio Foggia 1920 players
S.S.D. Lucchese 1905 players
Treviso F.B.C. 1993 players
Ravenna F.C. players
Como 1907 players
L.R. Vicenza players
Genoa C.F.C. players
Ascoli Calcio 1898 F.C. players
Modena F.C. players
U.C. AlbinoLeffe players
A.C. Ancona players
U.S. Cremonese players
A.C. Monza players
Serie A players
Serie B players
Association football forwards
Sportspeople from the Metropolitan City of Milan
1974 births
Living people
Footballers from Lombardy